Melanelia is a genus of lichenized fungi in the family Parmeliaceae. The genus was circumscribed by Ted Esslinger in 1978.

Species
Melanelia commixta (Nyl.) A.Thell (1995)
Melanelia hepatizon (Ach.) A.Thell (1995)
Melanelia microglabra Divakar, Upreti, G.P.Sinha & Elix (2003) – India
Melanelia pseudoglabra (Essl.) Essl. (1978)
Melanelia stygia (L.) Essl. (1978)

References

Parmeliaceae
Lichen genera
Lecanorales genera
Taxa described in 1978